Arcadio Fuentes (born 11 September 1965) is a Puerto Rican boxer. He competed in the men's light heavyweight event at the 1984 Summer Olympics.

References

External links
 

1965 births
Living people
Puerto Rican male boxers
Olympic boxers of Puerto Rico
Boxers at the 1984 Summer Olympics
Place of birth missing (living people)
Light-heavyweight boxers
20th-century Puerto Rican people